The 2015 European Triathlon Championships was held in Geneva, Switzerland from 9 July to 12 July 2015.

Medallists

Results

Men's 
Key
 # denotes the athlete's bib number for the event
 Swimming denotes the time it took the athlete to complete the swimming leg
 Cycling denotes the time it took the athlete to complete the cycling leg
 Running denotes the time it took the athlete to complete the running leg
 Difference denotes the time difference between the athlete and the event winner
 Lapped denotes that the athlete was lapped and removed from the course
0

Women's 
Key
 # denotes the athlete's bib number for the event
 Swimming denotes the time it took the athlete to complete the swimming leg
 Cycling denotes the time it took the athlete to complete the cycling leg
 Running denotes the time it took the athlete to complete the running leg
 Difference denotes the time difference between the athlete and the event winner
 Lapped denotes that the athlete was lapped and removed from the course
0

References

External links 
 Official page

European Triathlon Championships
Triathlon in Switzerland
International sports competitions hosted by Switzerland
Geneva